403 Battle Group is the only military organization of Bangladesh Army established to test and validate existing and new doctrine related to training and operations. It is part of the Army Training and Doctrine Command (ARTDOC).

Overview 
On 25 July 2007 the Flag Raising Ceremony of newly established 403 battle group and five units under its command was held at Mymensingh Cantonment in Mymensingh. ARTDOC undertakes various types of research and development related projects which are later validated through 403 Battle Group.

Mission 
The official mission statement for 403 Battle Group states:

Provide ground testing facilities to ARTDOC for formulating the doctrine of Bangladesh Army.

Components 
It has five units under its command. Then GOC of ARTDOC Major General Anwar Hossain inaugurated five units under its command. It has one Infantry Battalion, one Independent Armored Squadron, one Independent Field Battery Artillery, one Independent Field Engineer Company and one Independent Division Support Company.
 21 East Bengal Regiment .
 15 Independent Armored Squadron.
 34 Independent Field Battery Artillery.
 45 Independent Field Company Engineers.
 99 Independent division Support Company.
However, currently the Armored squadron and the Field Battery Artillery are not present in the Battle group.

References 

Army units and formations of Bangladesh
Military units and formations established in 2007